Rosa Rosales is an American political activist. She served as the 45th national president of the League of United Latin American Citizens, the largest and oldest Hispanic civil rights organization in the United States, from 2002 to 2010. Rosales advocates for Hispanics across the country on issues of education, health, housing, civil rights, and many other issues affecting Hispanics.

References

External links
Biography from LULAC National Office

American people of Mexican descent
American civil rights activists
University of Michigan alumni
Year of birth missing (living people)
Living people
League of United Latin American Citizens activists